Echo in the Canyon is a soundtrack for the documentary film of the same name.

Reception
Aidin Vaziri of The San Francisco Chronicle said the soundtrack "rings hollow", stating, "Dylan’s deep, oddly expressionless voice doesn’t necessarily do any favors to a genre known for its marked warmth, and his slick band of studio musicians adds to the disconnect," while praising the talent of the album's many guests. Stephen Thomas Erlewine of AllMusic commented, "Since everybody involved is a pro, this is tight, not loose, which means every cut feels a little too tidy and straight. Dylan proves to be an amiable host, [...] and the mellow camaraderie is appealing and even ingratiating. It isn't especially compelling, though."

Track listing

All led by Jakob Dylan.

Personnel

Fiona Apple - vocals
Beck - vocals
Justine Bennett - backing vocals
D.J. Bonebrake - vibraphone
Jade Castrinos - vocals
Lenny Castro - congas, percussion
Matt Chamberlain - drums
Daphne Chen - violin
Eric Clapton - electric guitar, vocals
Richard Dodd - cello
Jakob Dylan - vocals
Aaron Embry - harp, piano
Eric Gorfain - violin
Josh Homme - vocals
Ted Jensen - mastering
Norah Jones - vocals
Leah Katz - viola
Greg Leisz - acoustic guitar, banjo
Maude Maggart - vocals
Geoff Pearlman - 12 string guitar, acoustic guitar, electric guitar, steel guitar, slide guitar
Fernando Perdomo - coral sitar, glockenspiel, 12 string guitar, acoustic guitar, baritone guitar, electric guitar, Hammond organ, percussion
Cat Power - vocals
Dan Rothchild - bass, drums, backing vocals
Andrew Slater - acoustic guitar, fuzz guitar
Regina Spektor - vocals
Jawn Starr - piano
Stephen Stills - electric guitar, vocals
Jordan Summers - mellotron, Hammond organ, piano, strings, Vox organ
Matt Tecu - Drums
Patrick Warren - chamberlin, keyboards, Hammond organ, percussion
Dave Way - engineer, mixing
Neil Young - Vocals

References

2019 soundtrack albums